The 2003 Scottish Cup Final was played on 31 May 2003 at Hampden Park in Glasgow and was the final of the 117th Scottish Cup. The final was contested by Dundee and Rangers. Rangers won the match 1–0 with a Lorenzo Amoruso headed goal in the second half.

Match details

2003
Scottish Cup Final 2003
Scottish Cup Final 2003
Cup Final
2000s in Glasgow
May 2003 sports events in the United Kingdom